The following article presents a summary of the 1916 football (soccer) season in Brazil, which was the 15th season of competitive football in the country.

Campeonato Paulista

In 1916 there were two different editions of the Campeonato Paulista. One was organized by the Associação Paulista de Esportes Atléticos (APEA) while the other one was organized by the Liga Paulista de Foot-Ball (LPF).

APEA's Campeonato Paulista

Final Standings

Paulistano declared as the APEA's Campeonato Paulista champions.

LPF's Campeonato Paulista

Final Standings

SC Internacional de São Paulo and Germânia matches were canceled, as both clubs abandoned the competition.

The LPF's Campeonato Paulista was not concluded as APEA's and LPF's competitions fused, and Corinthians declared as the LPF's Campeonato Paulista champions.

State championship champions

Brazil national team
The following table lists all the games played by the Brazil national football team in official competitions and friendly matches during 1916.

References

 Brazilian competitions at RSSSF
 1916 Brazil national team matches at RSSSF

 
Seasons in Brazilian football
Brazil